Alexz Wigg (born 11 November 1989), is an English International motorcycle trials rider.

Biography
Born in Aylesbury, United Kingdom, Wigg started riding at 4 years of age. He progressed through the schoolboy trials ranks and was European Youth Champion in 2004. For 2006 Wigg rode a Gas Gas motorcycle and contested the Youth World Championships and European Junior Championships, emerging as winner of both titles. 2007 saw him finish runner up in the Junior World Championships. For the 2008 season he was again runner-up in the Junior World Championship, and that year also in the Junior European Championship. Wigg finally clinched the Junior World title in 2010, along with the European Title and a win at the famous Scottish Six Days Trial. In 2011 he switched to riding for the Sherco factory team, contesting the FIM Trial World Championship. He hit problems mid-season and in 2012 he went back to riding in the world championships for the Gas Gas factory.

International Trials Championship Career

Honors
 FIM European Youth Champion 2004
 FIM European Junior Champion 2006
 FIM European Champion 2010

Related Reading
FIM Trial European Championship
FIM Trial World Championship
Scottish Six Days Trial

References

External links
 Alexz Wigg official site

1989 births
Living people
English motorcycle racers
Motorcycle trials riders
Sportspeople from Aylesbury